Conundrum is a fantasy novel by Jeff Crook, published in 2001. The story takes place in the Dragonlance setting, based on the Dungeons & Dragons fantasy role-playing game.

Plot summary

Conundrum follows a boat of gnomes, named the Indestructable, to sail around the world of Krynn. However, when they reach the doorway to the bottom of Krynn, things change.

Characters in "Conundrum"
Conundrum, gnome oiler and cartographer of the Indestructible
Commodore Briggs, gnome Commodore of the Indestructible
Doctor Bothy, gnome Medical Officer of the Indestructible
Snork, gnome Navigation Officer of the Indestructible; also Conundrum's cousin
Razmous Pinchpocket, kender Cartographer and Chief Acquisitions Officer of the Indestructible 
Professor Hap-Troggensbottle, gnome Science Officer of the Indestructible and researcher into why hot rocks float
Sir Tanar Lobcrow, human Thorn Knight and wizard

Release details
2001, USA, Wizards of the Coast , Pub date December 1, 2001, paperback

Conundrum is the first novel in the Age of Mortals series.

Reception
Conundrum has a rating of 3.9 stars on Goodreads.

Sources, references, external links, quotations

References

2001 American novels
American fantasy novels
Dragonlance novels
The Age of Mortals series novels